The discography of the Japanese pop duo Chage and Aska consists of 21 studio albums, 14 compilation albums, 26 video albums and 55 singles. Chage and Aska debuted in 1979 with the single "Hitorizaki", which peaked at number 24 on the Oricon Singles Chart. In 1980, their single "Banri no Kawa" was their first chart hit. Their 1991 single, "Say Yes", which was used as the theme to the Japanese drama , sold two million copies and is the sixth best-selling single of all time in Japan. The group had another double million seller in 1993 with "Yah Yah Yah". The group has sold about 31 million records in Japan.

Albums

Studio albums

Extended plays

Compilation albums

Cover albums

Live albums

Soundtrack albums

Box sets

Singles

As lead performers

As featured artists

Videography

Video albums

Notes

References

Discographies of Japanese artists
Pop music group discographies